Washington's 48th legislative district is one of forty-nine districts in Washington state for representation in the state legislature. It covers areas of Redmond, Bellevue (including West Lake Sammamish), and Kirkland, and it encompasses Clyde Hill, Yarrow Point, Hunts Point, and Medina. It also contains Bridle Trails State Park and Marymoor Park.

The district's legislators are state senator Patty Kuderer and state representatives Vandana Slatter (position 1) and Amy Walen (position 2), all Democrats.

See also
Washington Redistricting Commission
Washington State Senate
Washington House of Representatives
Washington (state) legislative districts

References

External links
Washington State Redistricting Commission
Washington House of Representatives
Map of Legislative Districts

48